Jacob Smith may refer to:

Jacob Smith (fur trader) (born 1773), fur trader, American spy, and founder of Flint, Michigan
Jacob Smith (actor) (born 1990), Laurier University
Jacob  Smith (politician) (1816–1891), ship's captain, Mayor and MHA in South Australia
Jacob H. Smith (1840–1918), U.S. Army general during the Philippine–American War in 1901, and a veteran of the Wounded Knee Massacre
Jacob W. Smith (1851–1926), businessman and political figure in Saskatchewan, Canada
Jacob Getlar Smith (1898–1958), painter and muralist
Jacob Smith (boxer), English boxer, participated in Boxing at the 1930 British Empire Games
Jacob Smith (field hockey), played for New Zealand men's national field hockey team

See also
Jake Smith (disambiguation)